Albiach is a Catalan surname. Notable people with the surname include:

Anne-Marie Albiach (1937–2012), French poet and translator
Jéssica Albiach (born 1979), Spanish politician
Néstor Albiach (born 1992), Spanish footballer
Mireia Casas Albiach

Catalan-language surnames